Peter Copley (20 May 1915 – 7 October 2008) was an English television, film and stage actor.

Biography
Copley was born in Bushey, Hertfordshire, son of the printmakers, John Copley and Ethel Gabain.

After changing his mind about joining the Royal Navy, he studied at the Old Vic School and in 1932 started out as a stage actor. He made his first film appearance in 1934, going on to play a wide variety of characters from the villainous to the meek and mild. In 1946 he appeared on stage in "Cyrano de Bergerac" at the New Theatre in London. 
TV credits include: Thorndyke, Danger Man, The Saint, The Avengers, The Forsyte Saga, The Troubleshooters, The Champions, Department S, Doomwatch, Z-Cars, Fall of Eagles, Survivors, Bless Me, Father (episode "A Legend Comes to Stay"), Father Brown (episode "The Curse of the Golden Cross"), Doctor Who (in the serial "Pyramids of Mars"), Sutherland's Law, Tales of the Unexpected, Miss Marple, Lovejoy, The Bill, Cadfael and One Foot in the Grave.

Copley continued to act well into his nineties.

A resident of Bristol, Copley was awarded an Honorary Degree of Master of Arts by the University of the West of England in 2001.

Filmography

References

External links
 
 
 
 Guardian Obituary

1915 births
2008 deaths
English male stage actors
English male film actors
English male television actors
People from Bushey
Copley, Robert
Male actors from Hertfordshire
English people of French descent
English people of Scottish descent